Bob Benzen (born March 3, 1959) is a Canadian Conservative Party of Canada politician, who served as the Member of Parliament for Calgary Heritage from 2017 to 2022. He was elected to the House of Commons of Canada in a by-election on April 3, 2017. He succeeded former Conservative Prime Minister Stephen Harper, who had resigned as an MP in 2016.

Prior to his election, Benzen was a businessman specializing in data storage and information management for energy companies.

Benzen was responsible for initiating Erin O'Toole's removal as Conservative leader in 2022, after he submitted a letter from 36 Conservative MPs calling for a leadership review.

Politics
Benzen voted in support of Bill C-233, an act to amend the Criminal Code of Canada (sex-selective abortion), which would make it an indictable or summary offence for a medical practitioner to knowingly perform an abortion solely on the grounds of the child's genetic sex.

Benzen voted against a bill that would prohibit forcing children or adults to undergo conversion therapy aimed at altering their sexual orientation, however, the bill was ultimately passed and conversion therapy in Canada was banned.

On October 21, 2022, Benzen announced that he would retire from his role as MP on December 31, 2022.

Electoral record

References

External links

1959 births
Businesspeople from Calgary
Conservative Party of Canada MPs
Members of the House of Commons of Canada from Alberta
Politicians from Calgary
Living people
21st-century Canadian politicians